The 2019–20 SSV Jahn Regensburg season is the 113th season in the club's football history. In 2019–20, the club played in the 2. Bundesliga, the second tier of German football. It is the club's third season back in this league after having won promotion from the 3. Liga in 2016–17.

The club also took part in the 2019–20 edition of the DFB-Pokal, the German Cup, but was eliminated in the first round.

Events
At the end of the last season, manager Achim Beierlorzer left Regensburg and joined 1. FC Köln which were newly promoted to the Bundesliga. He was replaced by former assistant manager Mersad Selimbegović.

The season was interrupted by the COVID-19 pandemic after 25th matchday. After two months, in May 2020, the season was re-started with the match against Holstein Kiel. This match was held without attendance like all the following matches until the end of the season. 

Regensburg could secure their place in the league with the victory over Karlsruher SC on 32nd matchday.

Transfers

In

Out

Preseason and friendlies

2. Bundesliga

2. Bundesliga fixtures & results

League table

DFB-Pokal

Player information
.

|}

Notes
A.   Kickoff time in Central European Time/Central European Summer Time.
B.   SSV Jahn Regensburg goals first.

References

SSV Jahn Regensburg seasons
Regensburg